Andrew Ireland is a Canadian rower. He won a silver medal in the men's coxed four at the 2004 World Rowing Championships and a bronze medal at the 2005 World Rowing Championships in the men's coxless four.

References 
Athlete profile page at https://worldrowing.com/athlete/8b21bd93-6207-440a-95eb-fb0d6a03a35c 

Living people
Canadian male rowers
World Rowing Championships medalists for Canada
Year of birth missing (living people)
21st-century Canadian people